The Tour of Crete is a multi-stage cyclosportive for amateur cyclists, held in the island of Crete, Greece, which took place for the first time in 2016 and will take place annually thereafter. It spans across 6 stages starting from and ending in the capital of the region of Crete, in the city of Heraklion.

Similarly to other cyclosportives, it is a non-competitive event, the routes of which are well sign-posted and marshalled. Riders are able to use feeding stations positioned at intervals along the route to replenish their food and drink supplies and mechanical and medical support is also provided.

Stages

References

External links
 The Tour of Crete official website
 The Tour of Crete on social media

Cyclosportives
Cycling in Greece
Recurring sporting events established in 2016
Sport in Crete